Bajool is a rural town and locality in the Rockhampton Region, Queensland, Australia.

Geography
Bajool is located on the Bruce Highway, 35 km south of Rockhampton and 74 km north of Gladstone. Eight-Mile Creek flows to the east of the town.

The North Coast railway line enters the locality from the west (Marmor) and exits to the north (Midgee) with two railway stations serving the locality (from north to south):

 Archer railway station
 Bajool railway station, serving the town 
The Bruce Highway runs almost parallel and immediately south of the railway line, except that it bypasses the town to the west.

The locality has the following mountains:

 Beschs Hill 
 Mount Gindiwarra 
 Mount Helen 
 Mount Hopeful 
 Mount Kelly 
 Mount Mccamley

History
The town takes its name from the Bajool railway station which was named by the Queensland Railways Department in 1903 using the Aboriginal name for the lagoon on the Archer brothers' property Gracemere. The name of the lagoon  has also been written as Padgole and Badul. It has been suggested that the meaning of the name was Big Fella water hole  or stop here.

A provisional school opened on 12 March 1888 at Eight Mile Creek under teacher Mr Beck (brother of J. Beck, chairman of the Fitzroy Shire Council); it closed in 1892. The school reopened on 30 September 1895 with teacher Michael Donovan, but closed again on 18 September 1896. On 5 February 1900, a part-time provisional school was established in a private home at a short-lived mining field called San Jose with 10 students under teacher William MacLean. On 2 September 1902,  another part-time school was opened in conjunction at the home of Mr H. Cross in Bajool with 6 students. In August 1903, the two part-time schools were combined into Bajool Provisional School with 31 students in another building on Cross's property. In 1903 the school closed for a while and the land it was using was resumed for the railway line from Gladstone to Rockhampton. However, the railway enabled Bajool to grow. The school re-opened on the southern side of Mill Street in late 1904, and became Bajool State School in 1909.

Ulam Upper Provisional School opened circa 1892. On 1 January 1909, it became Ulam Upper State School.  It closed circa 1961.

Ulam South Provisional School opened on 22 January 1894. On 1 January 1909, it became Ulam South State School. It closed in 1925.

Education

Bajool State School is a government primary (Prep-6) school for boys and girls at 54-60 Toonda Street.  In 2012, the school had 39 students and 2 teachers. In 2018, the school had an enrolment of 40 students with 4 teachers (3 full-time equivalent) and 5 non-teaching staff (2 full-time equivalent).

There are no secondary schools in Bajool. The nearest government secondary schools are Mount Larcom State School (to Year 10) in Mount Larcom to the south-east, Mount Morgan State High School (to Year 12) in Mount Morgan to the west, and Rockhampton State High School (to Year 12) in Wandal, Rockhampton, to the north.

Facilities
Bajool is the site of one of four Queensland Government explosives reserves (also known as "magazines"). From 1912 to 1986 a rail line ran from Bajool to Port Alma.

Bajool Cemetery is at 18 School Road.

References

Further reading

External links 
 

Suburbs of Rockhampton Region
Localities in Queensland